Christopher C. Davis (born January 23, 1984) is a  former gridiron football wide receiver. He was drafted by the Tennessee Titans in the fourth round of the 2007 NFL Draft. He played college football at Florida State.  Davis has been a member of the Cincinnati Bengals, New York Giants, Hartford Colonials, and Omaha Nighthawks in his football career.

Professional career

Hartford Colonials
Davis was signed by the Hartford Colonials in 2010. He was released on September 5.

Omaha Nighthawks
Davis was signed by the Omaha Nighthawks on June 10, 2011.

Montreal Alouettes
On March 26, 2012, Davis was signed by the Montreal Alouettes.

References

External links
 Florida State Seminoles bio
 Tennessee Titans bio

1984 births
Living people
American football wide receivers
American football return specialists
Florida State Seminoles football players
Tennessee Titans players
Cincinnati Bengals players
New York Giants players
Hartford Colonials players
Omaha Nighthawks players
Montreal Alouettes players
Tampa Bay Storm players
Columbus Lions players
Players of American football from St. Petersburg, Florida